Frauenroth Abbey is a former Cistercian nunnery in Burkardroth in Bavaria, South Germany, in the bishopric of Würzburg

The abbey, dedicated to Saint George and All Saints, was built in 1231 by Count Otto von Botenlauben and Beatrix de Courtenay, who were both later buried here. Following their deaths, their son, also called Otto, became head of the abbey.

The abbey ceased was dissolved in 1574, and was taken over by the administrative office of the Prince-Bishop of Würzburg. In 1691, the remains were sold to eight farmers in Burkardroth, who used them to build the village of Frauenroth. The former monastic chapel still stands and is used as a church.

Notes

References

Sources

Monasteries in Bavaria
Cistercian nunneries in Germany
Bad Kissingen (district)